Afonwen is a village in Flintshire, Wales. It is situated just under four miles from the A55 North Wales Expressway and on the A541 Mold-Denbigh road. At the 2001 Census, the population of Afonwen was included into the civil parish of Caerwys and was 1,319, with a total ward population of 2,496.

References

External links
Photos of Afonwen on geograph.org.uk

Villages in Flintshire
Caerwys